Chepelyovo is the name of several rural localities in Russia:
Chepelyovo, Moscow Oblast, a village in Stremilovskoye Rural Settlement of Chekhovsky District, Moscow Oblast
Chepelyovo, Smolensk Oblast, a village in Sobolevskoye Rural Settlement of Monastyrshchinsky District of Smolensk Oblast